Geisha Girl may refer to:
 Geisha girl
 Geisha Girl (film), a 1952 American adventure film
 Geisha Girl (song), a 1957 song by Hank Locklin

See also
 Geisha  (disambiguation)